The 2022 Middle East-Africa Rugby League Championship will be the third MEA Rugby League Championship, following the 2015 and 2019 tournaments, and the cancelled 2020 edition.

The competition will be held between 27 September to 2 October 2022 in Ghana. Originally, the competition was going to see the return of the same four teams from the 2019 tournament; Nigeria, Morocco, Cameroon and hosts Ghana. On 23 August 2022, Kenya were named to replace Morocco in the tournament when Morocco were forced to withdraw from the tournament due to governance issues. The winners of the tournament will also join the next phase of qualification for the 2025 Rugby League World Cup.

Participants

Squads
On 14 September 2022, each competing nation announced their squads for the tournament.

Cameroon
Jean Claude Bidjana, Armel Damdja, Cyrille Kamole, Nzokou Martial, Hermand Nguele, Patrick Nkouak, Lamare Oudi (Bulls RL), Emmanuel Tientchue (Gorilla RL), Mouhamed Embella, Christian Tedjou, Loic Tsasse (Guepard RL), Philippe Ambassa, Bekolo Elie Jean Bliase, Ledoux Fosso, Fabrice Joufang, Frank Watio (Panda RL) Pitoile Assomo, Paul Atungsiri Ndifor, Georgane Ngoufack (Rock RL)  Carol Manga, Khalil Njoya (Unattached).

Ghana
Yakubu Suleman (Accra Majestics), Jonas Moorkaar (Accra Panthers), Anane Benjamin, Bawa Bright, Geotrah Desmond, Collins Ofosu, Nigel Sackey (Bulls), Levi Osei (Canterbury Bulldogs), Sean Sabutey (Glebe Dirty Reds), Oliver Puman (Nungua Tigers), Jonathan Adotey, Philip Asomani, John Bless Mensah (Pirates), Emmanuel Acheampong, Riddick Alibah, Jordan Annan,  William Pearce Biney, Chris da Gama, Francis Lawson,David Nartey (Skolars), Isaac Akuoko (Wyong Roos).

Kenya
Denish Ndinya (AP), John Awiti Oketch, Raymond Ekutu (Rhinos), Tony Khadambi, Brony Lucky, Timothy Thimba (Ruffians), Joel Inzuga, Eliakim Kichoi, Celestine Mboi, Floyd Wambwire, (Sharks), James Maranga, Ramadan Masete, Finely Mokoro, Remi Odhiambo, Victor Odhiambo, Philimon Olang,  Paul Seda (Winam), Horus Alela, Ahmed Hamed, Collin Ochieng, Wyclif Ratemo (Wolves).

Nigeria
Anthony Tuoyo Egodo (Birmingham Mosley RFC), Michael Ayodeji Ogunwole (British Army), Abdullah Balogun (Castleford Tigers), Kalu Shedrack Agwu (Eko Trinity), Daniel Okoro (Hull KR), Jude Abrakson, Emmanuel Onyekwe Ebuk, Julius Godwin, Nuhu Ibrahim, Gabriel John, Issa Omale, Ibrahim Suraju, Bashir Usman, Obi Wilsom (Kano Lions), Azuka Chika, Daniel John, Isah Lawal-Saulawa (Bedford Tigers), Olisa Nwokedi, Kelvin Olisa, Akeem Yusuf (Lagos Haven), Rio-Osayomwanbo Christoper Corkill (St Helens).

Bracket

Fixtures

Semi-finals

Third place play-off

Final

See also

Rugby league in Africa
International rugby league in 2022

References

MEA Rugby League Championship
MEA Rugby League Championship
Rugby league international tournaments
Rugby league in Africa
MEA Rugby League Championship
MEA Rugby League Championship